Falam District is a district of the Chin State in Myanmar. It consists of 3 townships and 445 villages.  The major towns include: Fort White, and Falam.

Borders
Falam District borders:
Manipur State of India to the north;
Mizoram State of India to the west;
Mindat District to the south; and
Gangaw District of Magway Division, Kale District (Kalemyo District) of Sagaing Division, and Mawlaik District of Sagaing Division

Townships
The district contains the following townships in the past:
Falam Township
Tedim Township
Tonzang Township
After the formation of Hakha District by the first Chin State Hluttaw emergency meeting No. 2/2012 on 1 June, only Falam, Tiddim (Tedim) and Tunzan (Tonzang) townships remain in Falam District.

Notes

External links
 "Tedim District, Burma" SatelliteViews.net

Districts of Myanmar
Chin State